Babie is a village and municipality in the Vranov nad Topľou District in the Prešov Region of Slovakia.

Population
According to the 2011 census, the municipality had 252 inhabitants. All inhabitants were Slovaks.

Genealogical resources
The records for genealogical research are available at the state archive "Statny Archiv in Presov, Slovakia"
 Roman Catholic church records (births/marriages/deaths): 1766-1897
 Greek Catholic church records (births/marriages/deaths): 1847-1939
 Lutheran church records (births/marriages/deaths): 1766-1895
 Census records 1869 of Babie are available at the state archive.

See also
 List of municipalities and towns in Slovakia

References

External links
 
 http://en.db-city.com/Slovakia/Pre%C5%A1ov/Vranov_nad_Top%C4%BEou/Babie
 Surnames of living people in Babie

Villages and municipalities in Vranov nad Topľou District
Šariš